Genève-Eaux-Vives railway station is a railway station in the municipality of Geneva, in the Swiss canton of Geneva. It is an intermediate stop on the standard gauge CEVA orbital railway line of Swiss Federal Railways.

The station originally opened on 27 May 1888. This station was closed in 2011, and later demolished, to permit the construction of a new underground station on the CEVA line. The station reopened in December 2019 as part of the launch of the new Léman Express network.

Services 
 the following services stop at Genève-Eaux-Vives:

References

External links 
 
 

Railway stations in the canton of Geneva
Swiss Federal Railways stations
Railway stations in Switzerland opened in 1888